Gennady Mikhailovich Pishchayev (born July 30, 1927) is a Soviet opera singer, lyric tenor altino. Honored Artist of the RSFSR (1965).

Biography
Gennady was born in the village of Zirgan, Meleuzovsky District, Bashkir Autonomous Soviet Socialist Republic.  His brother Pavel  is an honorary citizen of the   Salavat, director of the sulfuric acid and catalyst plant of the Salavat petrochemical plant.

The parents of Gennady, Mikhail Stepanovich  and Klavdiya Petrovna (nee Makarova), were ordinary people. The grandfather of Gennady Pishchaev was a blacksmith. The family was very fond of singing, his father played the accordion well, his father's brother was considered a good singer. 

He was born without an arm, which did not prevent him from developing many talents. 

Currently lives in Moscow.

Career
He worked at the Bashkir Opera and Ballet Theater (Ufa), where he performed the part of Lensky in the opera Eugene Onegin (1966).

He worked at the Leningrad Maly Opera and Ballet Theatre, where he also performed the part of Lensky (1968). 

Since 1980 he taught at the vocal faculty of GITIS. 

In 1988, at the Bolshoi Theatre, he sang the part of the Astrologer in Rimsky-Korsakov's The Golden Cockerel. In the film Mirror for a Hero, Gennady Pishchayev sang Smith's serenade from Bizet's opera La jolie fille de Perth.

June 17, 1999 awarded the Order of Friendship.

Discography

Albums
 Gennady Pishchayev (Mono, 1960)
 Gennady Pishchayev (RP, 1968)
 Songs And Dances of The Renaissance (LP, 1977) with Sándor Kallós
 Romances (LP)
 Tchaikovsky. Sixteen Songs for Children (LP, 1980)

Singles
 Sweetheart, Wonderful / High Wave On the Volga (Mono, 1954) 
 Rendezvous (Mono, 1965)

References

External links 
 Геннадий Пищаев: «Наверное, я счастливый человек, потому что пел ту музыку, которая нравилась» 
 Gennady Pishchayev. Je Crois Entendre Encore

Living people
1927 births
People from Bashkortostan
Honored Artists of the RSFSR
Soviet tenors
Russian tenors
Soviet male opera singers